Mansell Street is a street in East London, which is part of the London Inner Ring Road. For most of its length from the north, this street marks the boundary between the City of London and the London Borough of Tower Hamlets. However, the southernmost part is entirely in Tower Hamlets.

History

Mansell Street was named after a relative of William Leman, whose great-uncle, John Leman had bought Goodman's Fields earlier in the seventeenth century. Alie Street ran along the western side, with Leman Street to the east, Prescot Street to the south, and Alie Street to the North. These new streets were developed in the late seventeenth century while Goodman's Fields was used as a tenterground.

Mansell Street estate
This estate was built in 1977 by the Guinness Trust. It consists of 194 homes and in 2019 there were plans for its redevelopment.

References

Streets in the London Borough of Tower Hamlets